Viliami Pasilio Tosi (born 18 July 1998) is a New Zealand rugby union player who plays for Bay of Plenty in the National Provincial Championship. His playing position is prop. He played No.8 for Southland but then transitioned to Prop.

Reference list

External links
itsrugby.co.uk profile

1998 births
New Zealand rugby union players
Living people
Rugby union props
Southland rugby union players
Bay of Plenty rugby union players
Hurricanes (rugby union) players